Santa Maria del Soccorso is a Roman Catholic church located in Via della Croce #8 the historic center of the town of Petriolo, province of Macerata, region of Marche, Italy.

History
The church with a decorative brick façade was originally called Santa Maria e San Basso, because it encompassed two earlier churches. The church was rebuilt between the 13th and 18th centuries. It houses a 15th-century fresco of an Enthroned Madonna and Child attributed to Lorenzo d’Alessandro. A 17th-century canvas depicting a Madonna del Suffragio was painted for the church of that name.

References

Petriolo
Roman Catholic churches in the Marche
Neoclassical architecture in le Marche
18th-century Roman Catholic church buildings in Italy
Neoclassical church buildings in Italy